Ocean View is an unincorporated community located within Dennis Township in Cape May County, New Jersey, United States. The area is served as United States Postal Service ZIP code 08230. The post office was established in 1872, with William Doolittle as the first postmaster.

As of the 2000 United States Census, the population for ZIP Code Tabulation Area 08230  was 5,589.

Demographics

Education 
Dennis Township Public Schools is the local K-8 school district, which feeds into Middle Township High School of Middle Township Public Schools.

Countywide schools include Cape May County Technical High School and Cape May County Special Services School District.

The Roman Catholic Diocese of Camden operates Bishop McHugh Regional School, which the Press of Atlantic City describes as being in Ocean View, though it lies outside of the CDP, and which has a Cape May Courthouse postal address.  students from the following Cape May County locations attended the school: Dennis Township, Avalon, Cape May, Lower Township, Middle Township, North Wildwood, Ocean City, Sea Isle City, Stone Harbor, Upper Township, Wildwood, and Woodbine. It also received students from Egg Harbor Township in Atlantic County and Millville in Cumberland County.

References

External links
Census 2000 Fact Sheet for ZIP Code Tabulation Area 08230 from the United States Census Bureau

Dennis Township, New Jersey
Unincorporated communities in Cape May County, New Jersey
Unincorporated communities in New Jersey